The 2015 FIBA Americas Championship for Women, held in Edmonton, Alberta, Canada, was the qualifying tournament for FIBA Americas at the 2016 Summer Olympics Basketball Tournament in Brazil. The champion qualified directly for the Olympics.

On the first day of the tournament, at coincident FIBA Central Board meetings in Tokyo, Brazil's men's and women's teams were granted automatic entry to the Olympic Tournament as highly ranked host teams.

After allowing for Brazil's and the tournament winner's direct qualification for the Olympics, the next highest three teams in this tournament went to the final 2016 Summer Olympics Basketball Qualifying Tournament, competing against the highest placed non-winners of the other regional Championships. As Brazil fell in the semifinals, Puerto Rico and Venezuela, as the third-placed teams in their groups, contested a fifth-place match. Venezuela eventually won that match and qualified for the Olympic qualifying tournament.

Canada went on to win its second title - defeating Cuba - the first after 20 years, when the tournament was also held in Canada.

Qualification

Host country
 (10)
Central American and Caribbean Sub-Zone: (2014 Centrobasket Women)
 (13)
 (28)
 (37)
 (-)
South American Sub-Zone: 2014 South American Basketball Championship for Women
 (7)
 (14)
 (26)
 (34)
Repechage winner:
 (-)

Note: 2014 FIBA Ranking in parentheses.

Venue

FIBA Americas awarded the hosting rights of the championship to Canada Basketball. All games were held at the Saville Community Sports Centre at the University of Alberta's South Campus in Edmonton.

Teams

Preliminary round
All times local (UTC−6)

Group A

Group B

Final round

Semifinals

Fifth place match

Third place match

Final

Final ranking

All-2015 FIBA Americas Women's Team

G –  Melisa Gretter
G –  Kia Nurse (Tournament MVP) 
F –  Yamara Delgado
F –  Clenia Noblet 
F –  Tamara Tatham

References

External links

FIBA Women's AmeriCup
2015 in women's basketball
2015–16 in Canadian basketball
2015 in Alberta
International women's basketball competitions hosted by Canada
2015–16 in North American basketball
2015–16 in South American basketball